Marina Anatolyevna Palei (née Spivak, in ; born 1 February 1955 in Leningrad) is a Russian-speaking Dutch writer, poet, scriptwriter.

Life and work
Marina Palei was born in Leningrad to twenty-year-old Jewish parents who had met in amateur theater group in Western Ukraine (the mother of Marina was originally from Leningrad) and come to Leningrad in order to study engineering. While they studied Marina was brought up by her maternal grandparents in a small town near Leningrad, Vsevolozhsk. Marina's early childhood, spent in nature, gave the powerful impetus to her lyrical creativity. Marina attended Primary School in Leningrad.

After her parents divorced, in her teenage years, Palei followed the complicated trajectory of her mother's life: she attended schools in the number of regions of the USSR (Kazakhstan, Chuvash Autonomous Republic, the Volga Region, Ukraine) and studied in many schools. The motif of homelessness and insecurity, always going to the existential generalization, also has been reflected in her works.

In 1972, Palei began studying medical profession at the Leningrad Institute of Medicine. After graduating in 1978, she worked in several temporary jobs, among them as a medical technician, cleaning woman, and model, and she participated in an amateur theater group. After suffering a nervous breakdown in 1983, Palei recovered and, starting in 1984, began to write poetry. She also began work as a night watchman, a choice typical for writers and artists of her generation, symbolizing their desire to opt out of officially sanctioned cultural institutions while allowing them state-mandated employment with long stretches of time to write.

Irina Rodnyanskaya, a family friend and editor at the literary journal Novyi mir, encouraged Palei to apply to the Maxim Gorky Literature Institute (in ). She was accepted, one of only five women in her class of eighty, and began writing fiction while taking classes at the institute. She gave up her night watchman job in 1987 to concentrate on writing, and her first publications were primarily literary criticism and reviews. It was during this time that Palei also became involved in the dissident movement, joining the independent Democratic Union (in ) party in 1988.

Palei's first published fiction was a short story, "Composition on Red and Blue" (later renamed "Virage"). The story was printed in "Sobesednik" (the weekly supplement to "Komsomolskaya Pravda") in 1989. However, it was the novella "Evgesha and Annushka" ("Znamya" 1990) that made her famous. In 1991, Palei's novella, "Cabiria from the Bypass Canal," was published in Novy Mir," bringing her instant critical acclaim and a nomination for the prestigious Russian Booker Prize. Despite harassment from the KGB for her political activities, Palei continued to publish. She graduated cum laude in 1991 and was invited to join the Writers' Union. Although Palei emigrated to the Netherlands in 1995, she has continued to publish in Russia. Her first collection, Birthplace of the Wind, which gathered together her best-known works and previously published story cycles, was published in 1998. This collection was followed by "Long Distance, ili Slavyanskyi Akcent" ("Long Distance or the Slavic Accent") – 2000, Vagrius, "The Lunch" (2000, Inapress), "Klemens" (2007, Vremya), "Tribute to Salamander" (2012, Eksmo).  In the years 2011–2013 the publishing-house Eksmo (Moscow) has published 9-volume collected works of her prose and drama.

Palei's prose has been translated into many languages, including English, German, French, Finnish, Norwegian, Swedish, Italian, Dutch, Slovakian, Slovenian, Estonian, Latvian, Japanese and Spanish.

Palei's many activities also include translations. She translated Italian, Dutch, Greek, English and Slovenian poetry and Flemish prose.

Marina Palei's literary achievements and her contribution to the contemporary literary process are well-known and highly regarded by international community. Literary critics and specialists in modern literature esteem her work as a progressive modern development of great traditions of Russian literature. Marina has been a guest of honor of many European literary festivals; her writings are included into obligatory reading program and seminars of several European and American Universities, her art is a subject of multiple philological studies, essays, dissertations, etc.

In 1995, due to the categorical rejection of the political regime in Russia, Marina Paley emigrated to the Netherlands, where, over time, she received Dutch citizenship. She considers herself a Dutch writer of Jewish origin, writing in Russian. She is an active oppositionist in relation to the fascist regime of Russia. Since 2014 (since the beginning of Russia's aggression against Ukraine), she has cut off all ties with Russia and switched entirely to FB.

Membership in organizations
 Auteursbond — Dutch Union of Writers and Translators
 Netwerk scenarioschrijvers – Dutch Associations of Film and TV professionals
 Federation of Screenwriters in Europe

Literary awards

Shortlist
"The Lunch" novel – Smirnoff-Booker Prize 2000
"The Farm" novella – I.P. Belkin Prize 2005 (Novella of the Year Prize)
"Klemens" novel – The Big Book Prize() 2006
"Raya & Aad" novella – I.P. Belkin Prize 2009

Winner
"Choir" novel – The Russian Award 2011

Bibliography

Publications in Russian Language

Books in Russian (prose and drama / scripts)
"Ward of Lost Souls" (in other translations: "Department of the Lost"; "The Bloody Women's Ward";  "The Losers' Division")- Moskovskii Rabochii publishing house, Moscow, 1991.
"Wind-Field" – Limbus Press publishing house, Saint-Petersburg, 1998.
"Long Distance, or the Slavic Accent" – Vagrius publishing house, Moscow, 2000.
"The Lunch" – Inapress publishing house, Saint-Petersburg, 2000.
"Klemens" – Vremya publishing house, Moscow, 2007. 
"Choir" (novel), including novella "Raya and Aad" (Eksmo publishing house. The Author series, 2011).
"Cabiria of the Obvodnyi Channel". Romance novella's and Short Stories. (Eksmo publishing house. The Author's series, 2012)
"Tribute to Salamander". Petersburg's novel. (Eksmo publishing house. The Author series, 2012). 
"The Lunch". Novel-riot. (Eksmo publishing house. The Author series, 2012).
"Zhora Zhirnyago". Novel-pamphlet. (Eksmo publishing house. The Author series, 2012).
"Klemens". Novel. (Eksmo publishing house. The Author series, 2012).
"The Book with Dedications", Novella’s. (Eksmo publishing house, The Aurtor series, 2013).
"The Day of poplar fluff", Short stories. (Eksmo publishing house, The Aurtor series, 2013).
"The Gallery", Scripts and Plays. (Eksmo publishing house, The Aurtor series, 2014).
"Summer cinema", a new genre: story-film.  (Labbardaan/Smaragd publishing house, Rotterdam — Kiev, 2018)

"Poetic collections in Russian Language"
 "Control Кiss to the Head" (love lyrics), in Author's series "Universal Donor" (Ехclusive, 2017), Ukraine, in Russian
 "Ingermanland", in Author's series "Universal Donor" (Ехclusive, 2017), Ukraine, in Russian
  "Prison Knock" (Civil Lyrics), in Author's series "Universal Donor" (Ехclusive, 2019), Ukraine, in Russian
  "Young Monk" (love lyrics), in Author's series "Universal Donor" (Ехclusive, 2019), Ukraine, in Russian
 "Flutist" (love lyrics), in Author's series "Universal Donor" (Ехclusive, 2021), Ukraine, in Russian

Publications abroad

Books
"Die Cabiria vom Umleitungskanal" (Rowohlt, 1992). Germany
"Herinnerd huis" (Pegasus, 1995). The Netherlands
"Ringkanali Cabiria" ( Perioodika, 1995). Estonia
"Cabiria di Pietroburgo" (Il Saggiatore, 1996). Italy
"Rückwärtsgang der Sonne" (Droschl, 1997). Austria
"Inmitten von fremden Ernten" (Kitab, 2010). Austria
 "Klemens" (Voland, 2011). Italy
 "Küla" (SA Kultuurileht, 2012). Estonia
 «Raja & Aad» (Douane). 2015, The Netherlands
 «Mónechka» (Automatica), 2016, Spain
 «El coro» (Automatica), 2017,  Spain

Anthologies
The anthology “Kali for Women” – a short story: The Bloody Women's Ward – Conscience Deluded, Deli, India, 1994 (in English)
The anthology “Lives in Transit”- a short stories: Rendezvous; The Losers' Division – Ardis, US, 1995 (in English)
Almanac "Glas" (New Russian Writing) – a short story: The Bloody Women's Ward – 3, US, UK, Russia, 1995 (in English)
The anthology “Present Imperfect” – a fragment: Cabiria from the Bypass – Westview Press, Colorado (US ), Oxford (UK), 1996 (in English)
The anthology "Puhu, Maria!" – a novel Cabiria Kanavanrannan – Tammi, Helsinki, 1997 (in Finnish)
The anthology "Russian Women Writing" – a short story Skazki Andersena – Shinchosha, Tokyo, Japan, 1998 (in Japanese).
The anthology "Poetik der Grenze": "Der Aus: -gang, weg”(Еssay) – Steirische Verlagsgesellschaft, Graz, Austria, 2003 (in German)
The anthology “Graz von Aussen”: “Graz: Ein unterhaltsames Hologramm"(Еssay) – Droschl, Graz, Austria 2003 (in German)
The anthology "Immerhin ein Ausweg": "Der Tag des Pappelflaums" (Erzählung) – Deutscher Taschenbuch Verlag, München, Germany, 2003 (in Russian and German)
The anthology "Russisk samtidslitteratur": "Fra Long distance, eller slavisk aksent" (Script-Novella) – NORAHL & EFTF, Norway, 2007 (in Norwegian)
The anthology "Halbwegs zum Himmel" (Essay) – Leykam, Graz, Austria, 2007 (in German)

References

External links
 http://www.marina-palei.com Official website
 http://magazines.russ.ru/authors/p/mpalej Marina Palei's page on Zgurnal’nyi Zal  site

Russian screenwriters
Russian women novelists
Russian women short story writers
Russian translators
1955 births
Living people
International Writing Program alumni
Maxim Gorky Literature Institute alumni